Jacob Daniël du Toit (21 February 1877 – 1 July 1953), better known by his pen name Totius, was an Afrikaner poet.

He was the son of Stephanus Jacobus du Toit and Elisabeth Jacoba Joubert.

Life
The poet D.J. Opperman compiled brief biographical notes in Afrikaans about Du Toit. Du Toit began his education at the Huguenot Memorial School at Daljosafat in the Cape (1883–1885). He then moved to a German mission school named Morgensonne near Rustenburg from 1888 to 1890 before returning, between 1890 and 1894, to his original school at Daljosafat. Later he attended a theological college at Burgersdorp before becoming a military chaplain with the Boer Commandos during the Second Boer War.  

After the war, he studied at the Free University in Amsterdam and received a  Doctor of Theology degree. He became an ordained minister of the Reformed Church of South Africa  and from 1911 he was a professor at the Theological College of this Reformed Church in Potchefstroom. On the celebration of his sixtieth birthday, Totuis was honoured throughout South Africa. On the behalf of the nation, the FAK presented him with a Van Wouw-statuette as a token of gratitude for his work as poet, Bible translator, cultural leader and academic. He also received a travel grant which enabled him and his wife to visit the Biblical countries and Europe. His impressions of these visits to foreign lands are included in the collection Skemering (1948). (The word Skemering is a pun and difficult to translate. It can be interpreted as "twilight" but also as "faint recollection"). In the same year, he also received honorary doctorates upon him by the University of Stellenbosch and the Gemeentelike Universiteit, Amsterdam. 

Du Toit was a deeply religious man and a conservative one in most senses. His small son died of an infection and his young daughter, Wilhelmina, was killed by lightning, falling into his arms dead as she ran towards him. Du Toit recorded this calamity in the poem "O die pyn-gedagte" (literally "Oh the pain-thoughts").

Du Toit was responsible for much of the translation of the Bible into Afrikaans, finishing what his father Stephanus Jacobus du Toit had begun. He also put a huge amount of work into producing poetic versions of the Psalms in Afrikaans. His poetry was in the main lyrical and dealt, inter alia, with faith and with nature, as well as more political themes such as British imperialism and the Afrikaner nation. He left behind many collections of poems, including Trekkerswee (1915; “Trekkers' Grief”), Passieblomme (1934; “Passion Flowers”), "Uit donker Afrika" (1936) as well as a volume of poetry rhymed Psalms were published. 

He was on the committee that founded Potchefstroom Gimnasium in 1907 and chancellor of the Potchefstroom University for Christian Higher Education, from 1951-1953.

Poetry

One of the poems from Skemering was translated by C.J.D Harvey as follows:

"Night at Sea – Near Aden"

Nothing but sea and darkness everywhere
as when the earth was desolate and void
and o'er the world-pool hung night, unalloyed
No star and no horizon visible,
no sight or sign the wandering eye to guide,
I hear only the waves beating the side.
Though she sails always on, she now sails blind,
the prow thrusts forward, cleaving through the night.
Only upon the compass, shafts of light.

Another poem, from Passieblomme, translated by J.W. Marchant:

"The World is not our Dwelling Place"

The world is not our dwelling place
I see this in the sun that flees
and see it in the heron that, mistrustfully,
the same sun sees
on one leg from the reedy dale
and once the final rays are gone
a chill spills from this queachy lea
a frigid thrill runs right through me
I see it then in everything
that dusk throws round me in a ring
the world is not our dwelling place
  
The world is not our dwelling place
I see it when the moon blood red
rising from its field-dust bed
still (only just) the church-roof pares
from where an owl, abstrusely dumb,
sits and at that crescent stares.
As it grows quiet down the way
I recollect how, late today,
the mourners of the afternoon
emerged where owl now meets the moon
I mark it then in everything
while even tightens in a ring
the world is not our dwelling place
   
The world is not our dwelling place
I feel it when the winds awake
and oaken branches clash and break
I hear it in the fluttering
of little birds whose wings are thrown
against the branches smashed and blown
and find on coming closer yet
by moonbeam's vacillating light
a nest of fledglings overset
hurled down by tempest, shattered, dead
and feel it then in everything
as nighttime closes in a ring
the world is not our dwelling place

Honors and recognition
Du Toit (under the name Totius) appeared on a South African postage stamp in 1977.

In 1977, a statue of Totius by the sculptor Jo Roos was placed in the Totius Garden of Remembrance, in Potchefstroom. The statue was restored by Roos in 2009, and moved to the Potchefstroom Campus of North-West University. It was removed in 2015 at the request of the Reformed Churches of South Africa (RCSA), after consultation with the Du Toit family, with the intention of instead displaying it on RCSA property.

References
  (1) Opperman, D.J. Undated; probably 1962. Senior Verseboek.  Nationale Boekhandel Bpk, Kaapstad. Negende Druk, 185pp. Translation for Wikipedia by J.W. Marchant 2005.
  (2) Schirmer, P. 1980. The concise illustrated South African Encyclopaedia. Central News Agency, Johannesburg. First edition, about 211pp.
  (3) AP Grove and CJD Harvey. Afrikaans Poems with English Translations. Oxford University Press, Cape Town, 1969.

Notes

External links 

 

1877 births
1953 deaths
People from Paarl
Cape Colony people
Afrikaner people
South African people of French descent
Members of the Reformed Churches in South Africa
Afrikaans-language poets
20th-century South African poets
Translators of the Bible into Afrikaans
South African male poets
20th-century South African male writers
Vrije Universiteit Amsterdam alumni
Hertzog Prize winners for poetry